Sardar Muhammad Yaqoob Khan (born 1953) was elected the 22nd president of Azad Jammu & Kashmir, Pakistan on 25 August 2011. Sardar Muhammad Yaqoob Khan was a business tycoon before a politician he owns a trading company,  hotels, towers, housing societies, and overseas business. He owns the YK group of companies.

Early life
Sardar Muhammad Yaqoob Khan was born in 1953 in a village Ali Sojal (Khai Gala) in Rawalakot tehsil, and brother of renowned figure in political and social scenario of Azad Kashmir Haji Muhammad Zaman Khan. He graduated from Karachi University and started his political career with an ethnic political party Punjabi Pakhtoon Ittehad in Karachi. He joined a Azad Kashmiri political party Tahreek-e-Amil and was elected as senior vice President of this party later on. He also had a political affiliation with All Jammu and Kashmir Muslim Conference.

Political career
Sardar Muhammad Yaqoob Khan was elected as Member of Azad Jammu & Kashmir Legislative Assembly three times and took over ministerial jobs as Minister for Health, Population Welfare & Hydro Electric Board, and Housing & Planning.He is currently MLA from LA 20 Alisojal.

As Prime Minister
Sardar Muhammad Yaqoob Khan became the Prime Minister of Azad Jammu & Kashmir on 6 January 2009. After a successful no confidence vote over former premiere Sardar Attique Ahmed Khan.

As President
He was elected  22nd  President of Azad Jammu & Kashmir on 25 August 2011

References 

Living people
1953 births
Azad Kashmir MLAs 2021–2026
Pahari Pothwari people
People from Rawalakot
Presidents of Azad Kashmir
University of Karachi alumni